Atdhe Nuhiu (born 29 July 1989) is a Kosovan professional footballer who plays as a forward for Austrian Bundesliga club SC Rheindorf Altach.

Club career

SV Ried
On 31 August 2009, on the deadline day, Nuhiu completed a transfer to SV Ried on loan for the 2009–10 season. He scored his first goal for the team on 23 September 2009 in team's 1–1 away draw at Austria Wien, just eleven days after making his debut in a losing effort against SV Mattersburg.

Rapid Wien
On 8 June 2010, Nuhiu joined fellow Austrian Bundesliga side SK Rapid Wien on a three-year contract with an option of a further one. His salary was reported to be €1.2 million per season, plus various bonuses depending on his performances. He choose squad number 15, and made his competitive debut on 22 August in the Bundesliga matchday 5 against SV Mattersburg, partnering his patriot Hamdi Salihi in an eventual 2–0 home win. Nuhiu opened his scoring account later on 13 November by scoring a last-minute equaliser against the same opponent, with the match ending 2–2.

Sheffield Wednesday

2013–14 season
Nuhiu signed a three-year contract on a free transfer for Sheffield Wednesday on 25 July 2013. On 3 August 2013, Nuhiu scored on his debut against Queens Park Rangers. Nuhiu also scored in the comprehensive 6–0 win over Leeds United on 11 January 2014. On 1 March 2014 he scored against Middlesbrough from penalty spot in a match finished in the victory 1–0. On 12 April 2014, Nuhiu scored twice to give his team a 3–3 draw against Blackburn Rovers, where he was included in the starting line up and scored respectively the 2nd goal in the 72nd minute and the 3rd in the 5th minute of second-half stoppage time. Nuhiu scored in the next consecutive fixture on 17 April 2014 against AFC Bournemouth finished in the victory 2–4, where Nuhiu scored the opening goal of the match in the 16th minute. He continued his scoring form for another consecutive match, as he scored in the 3–2 home defeat of Sheffield Wednesday against Charlton Athletic on 21 April 2014, where Nuhiu scored a quick goal in the 3rd minute and also gave the assist for the second goal scored by Chris Maguire in the 8th minute.

2014–15 season
On 23 August 2014, Nuhiu scored twice in the 2–3 victory against Middlesbrough, helping the team to extended their unbeaten Championship start to four matches. On the last day of the season, Nuhiu scored an important stoppage-time equalizer which meant opponents Watford came second and Bournemouth won the league. During this season, Nuhiu was Sheffield Wednesday's top scorer with 11 goals in all competitions.

2017–18 season
On the final day of the 2017–18 season, Sheffield Wednesday defeated Norwich 5–1 for the second successive year in a row and in that game Wednesday won a penalty in the remaining minutes of the game and Nuhiu scored and completed the hat-trick and got his first hat-trick in his professional footballing career. That goal made Nuhiu Wednesday's top scorer at the end of the season. In May 2018, he signed a 2 year contract extension running through May 2020; Nuhiu left Wednesday after the end of the 2019-2020 season.

APOEL
On 11 September 2020, it was announced that he had signed for Cypriot club APOEL. After one season his contracted was terminated on 18 June 2021.

Rheindorf Altach
On 30 June 2021, Nuhiu signed a two-year contract with Rheindorf Altach, marking his return to the Austrian Bundesliga. He made his competitive debut on 17 July, in the first round of the 2021–22 edition of the Austrian Cup, also scoring his first goal in a surprising 2–1 loss to third-tier Regionalliga side SC Kalsdorf. He made his league debut in a 1–0 defeat to LASK at home a week later on 24 July, where he played 63 minutes before being replaced by Noah Bischof. His first goal came against his former club Rapid Wien on 15 August, a converted penalty-kick in injury time to secure a 2–1 win.

International career

Nuhiu has played for the Austria U21 side, however on 10 September 2009 he made declarations to the media that he would not play for Austria, but rather for Albania as it is his dream to play for his own nation. In addition, when he scored two goals against the Albanian U21s in a qualifier match, he refused to celebrate. On that occasion he was wearing red-and-black boots to honor Albania. In an interview in April 2014, Nuhiu declared that it is his only intention to play for Austria, although he admitted that he had been in talks with other associations previously. On 7 November 2014, Nuhiu reiterated his desire to play for Austria, should a call-up arise.

On 18 November 2010, Nuhiu stated in an interview to the media that the problem with playing for Albania was citizenship, as he had Austrian citizenship and to receive Albanian citizenship he needed to give it up, as Austria did not permit dual citizenship. Media reported that he was called by the coach of Albania, Gianni de Biasi, for the friendly match against Armenia, on 14 August, but De Biasi did not include him in the final call up. However, on 20 August 2013 media reported that Nuhiu had started the procedures to get an Albanian passport in order to be able to represent the senior Albania national team in the future.

Kosovo
On 19 September 2014, Nuhiu returned declaring that he would play for Kosovo, when it was fully recognised by UEFA and FIFA. On 20 September 2016, Muharrem Sahiti, the assistant manager of Kosovo, said that Nuhiu was in Kosovo to complete the procedures of the Kosovo passport. On 4 January 2017, Nuhiu announced that he had received Kosovo citizenship and is ready for the next challenge. On 20 March 2017, he received a call-up from Kosovo for a 2018 FIFA World Cup qualifying match against Iceland, made his début after being named in the starting line-up and scored his side's only goal during a 2–1 defeat.

On 16 May 2021, Nuhiu through an Instagram post announced his international retirement. He collected 19 caps between 2017 and 2020 for Kosovo and scored three goals.

Personal life
Atdhe Nuhiu was born on 29 July 1989 in Pristina, Kosovo to Albanian parents originally from Preševo.

Career statistics

Club

International

Scores and results list Kosovo's goal tally first, score column indicates score after each Nuhiu goal.

|-
|style="text-align:center"|1
|24 March 2017
|Loro Boriçi Stadium, Shkodër, Albania
|
|style="text-align:center"|1–2
|style="text-align:center"|1–2
|2018 FIFA World Cup qualification
|
|-
|style="text-align:center"|2
|10 September 2018
|Fadil Vokrri Stadium, Pristina, Kosovo
|
|style="text-align:center"|2–0
|style="text-align:center"|2–0
|2018–19 UEFA Nations League D3
|
|-
|style="text-align:center"|3
|14 November 2019
|Doosan Arena, Plzeň, Czech Republic
|
|style="text-align:center"|1–0
|style="text-align:center"|1–2
|UEFA Euro 2020 qualifying
|
|}

References

External links

Sheffield Wednesday profile 

1989 births
Living people
Sportspeople from Pristina
Kosovo Albanians
Kosovan emigrants to Austria
Austrian people of Kosovan descent
Austrian people of Albanian descent
Association football forwards
Kosovan footballers
Kosovo international footballers
Austrian footballers
Austria youth international footballers
Austria under-21 international footballers
FC Wels players
SK Austria Kärnten players
SV Ried players
SK Rapid Wien players
SC Rheindorf Altach players
Austrian Football Bundesliga players
Eskişehirspor footballers
Süper Lig players
Sheffield Wednesday F.C. players
English Football League players
APOEL FC players
Cypriot First Division players
Austrian expatriate footballers
Kosovan expatriate footballers
Expatriate footballers in Turkey
Austrian expatriate sportspeople in Turkey
Kosovan expatriate sportspeople in Turkey
Expatriate footballers in England
Austrian expatriate sportspeople in England
Kosovan expatriate sportspeople in England
Expatriate footballers in Cyprus